Vincent-Guillaume Otis (born April 13, 1978) is a Canadian actor from Quebec. He is most noted for his roles in the television series District 31, for which he won the Prix Gémeaux for Best Actor in a Drama Series in 2018, and the film Norbourg, for which he won the Prix Iris for Best Actor at the 24th Quebec Cinema Awards in 2022.

He received two prior Jutra Award nominations for Best Actor at the 11th Jutra Awards in 2009 for the film Babine, and Best Supporting Actor at the 16th Jutra Awards in 2004 for Gabrielle.

He is married to actress Éveline Gélinas.

Filmography

Film

Television

References

External links

1978 births
Living people
21st-century Canadian male actors
Canadian male film actors
Canadian male television actors
French Quebecers
Male actors from Quebec
National Theatre School of Canada alumni
Best Actor Jutra and Iris Award winners